ACT-335827 is an orally available, selective orexin 1 receptor antagonist with anxiolytic effects in animals. Unlike other orexin receptor antagonists, ACT-335827 lacks sedative effects and was found to have no impact on sleep architecture in mice.

References

Benzylisoquinolines
Orexin antagonists